Kamil Antonik (born 28 November 1998) is a Polish professional footballer who plays as a midfielder for Resovia Rzeszów.

Club career
On 2 October 2020 he signed a two-year contract with Zagłębie Sosnowiec.

References

1998 births
People from Lubaczów
Sportspeople from Podkarpackie Voivodeship
Living people
Polish footballers
Association football midfielders
Resovia (football) players
Arka Gdynia players
Zagłębie Sosnowiec players
Ekstraklasa players
I liga players
II liga players
III liga players